Caloptilia rhoifoliella (sumac leafblotch miner) is a moth of the family Gracillariidae. It is known from Bermuda, Canada (including Manitoba, Québec and Ontario) the United States (including Mississippi, New York, Kentucky, California, Florida, Georgia, Maine, Maryland, Michigan, Minnesota, Missouri, New Jersey, Texas, Vermont, North Carolina, Illinois, Kansas and Louisiana).

The wingspan is about 13 mm. Adults are on wing in September, November, March and April in Florida and in May in Texas.

The larvae feed on Rhus species (including Rhus copallina, Rhus lanceolata, Rhus toxicodendron and Rhus typhina), Schinus terebinthifolia, Toxicodendron pubescens and Toxicodendron radicans. They mine the leaves of their host plant. The mine starts as a linear mine at either side of the leaf. It later becomes a tentiform mine and at the end the larva rather clumsily rolls the leaf downward from the tip.

References

External links
Caloptilia at microleps.org
mothphotographersgroup
Bug Guide

rhoifoliella
Moths of North America
Moths described in 1876